A statue of Phillips Brooks is installed outside the Trinity Church in Boston's Copley Square, in the U.S. state of Massachusetts.

Description and history
The memorial is credited to sculptors Augustus Saint-Gaudens and Frances Grimes, and architects Stanford White and Charles Follen McKim. It was commissioned 1893 by the church congregation at a cost of $80,000, and was completed during 1907–1910. The bronze statues of Brooks and Jesus stand in a domed marble niche that measures approximately 17 ft. x 14 ft. 1 in. x 38 in. The figures rest on a granite base that measures approximately 5 x 11 x 9 ft. An inscription on the front of the base reads in bronze lettering: "PHILLIPS BROOKS / PREACHER OF THE WORD OF GOD / LOVER OF MANKIND / BORN IN BOSTON AD MDCCCXXXV / DIED IN BOSTON AD MDCCCXCIII / THIS MONUMENT IS ERECTED BY / HIS FELLOW CITIZENS AD MCMX".

References

External links

 

Bronze sculptures in Massachusetts
Marble sculptures in Massachusetts
Monuments and memorials in Boston
Outdoor sculptures in Boston
Sculptures by Augustus Saint-Gaudens
Sculptures of men in Massachusetts
Statues in Boston
Statues of Jesus